Haplochromis microdon is a species of cichlid endemic to Lake Victoria though it may now be extinct.  This species can reach a length of  SL.

References

microdon
Fish of Tanzania
Fish of Lake Victoria
Fish described in 1906
Taxonomy articles created by Polbot